The Max Planck Institute for Physics and Astrophysics is a former institute of the Max Planck Society in Germany. Located in  Munich, it was also known as the Werner Heisenberg Institute. The institute was founded in 1958 as a successor to the Max Planck Institute for Physics in Göttingen. In 1991, it was split into two successor institutes, the current Max Planck Institute for Physics and Max Planck Institute for Astrophysics, both located in Garching.

Physics and Astrophysics
Astrophysics institutes